Jacek Braciak (born 12 May 1968) is a Polish film and theater actor. He has appeared in more than 60 films since 1991. He received the Polish Academy Award for Best Supporting Actor for Edi and Rose.

Selected filmography
 Edi (2002)
 The Master (2005)
 Retrieval (Z odzysku) (2006)
 Katyń (2007)
 Little Rose (Różyczka) (2010)
 Rose (Róża) (2011)
 Traffic Department (Drogówka) (2013) 
 The Mighty Angel (2014)
 Volhynia (2016)
 Clergy (2018)
 Leave No Traces (2021)

References

External links
 Jacek Braciak at filmpolski.pl

 

1968 births
Living people
Polish male film actors
Polish male voice actors
20th-century Polish male actors
21st-century Polish male actors
People from Drezdenko